The 2018 Idol Star Athletics Bowling Archery Rhythmic Gymnastics Aerobics Championships was held at Goyang Gymnasium in Goyang, South Korea on January 15 and was broadcast on MBC on February 15 and 16 for four episodes at 5:10 PM KST.

Synopsis
The show features male and female K-pop entertainers, which competes in various sports competitions. At the championships, a total of ten events (four in athletics, two in ten-pin bowling, two in archery (which has switched to 7 shots per round instead of 10), one in aerobics and one in rhythmic gymnastics) were contested: six by men and five by women. There were more than 200 K-pop idols participating, divided into 14 teams.

Cast

Presenters
Jun Hyun-moo, Super Junior's Leeteuk and Apink's Yoon Bo-mi hosted the show.

Main
Full 2018 ISAC New Year's line-up

Male 
Exo, Wanna One, BtoB, VIXX, Seventeen, Nu'est W, Monsta X, Astro, Highlight, NCT 127, UP10TION, Snuper, KNK, Victon, Imfact, ONF, The East Light, Romeo, Golden Child MVP, MXM, The Boyz, BLK, IN2IT, Rainz, Top Secret, TraxX, and Myteen.

Female
Twice, Red Velvet, GFriend, Lovelyz, Laboum, Oh My Girl, DIA, Cosmic Girls, Gugudan, Apink, Nine Muses, April, Pristin, Weki Meki, Dreamcatcher, CLC, Momoland, Berry Good, Baby Boo, Favorite, H.U.B, Gate9, S.I.S, Busters, Hash Tag, Kriesha Chu, Yuseol, ELRIS, and 1NB.

Results

Men
Athletics

Aerobics

Archery

Bowling

Women
Athletics

Rhythmic Gymnastics

Archery

Bowling

Ratings

References

External links 

 2018 Idol Star Athletics Archery Rhythmic Gymnastics Aerobics Championships

MBC TV original programming
South Korean variety television shows
South Korean game shows
2018 in South Korean television
Idol Star Athletics Championships